Mashatuk (also Romanized as Māshātūk; also known as Mashtik and Meshtyk) is a village in Molla Sara Rural District, in the Central District of Shaft County, Gilan Province, Iran. At the 2006 census, its population was 753, in 199 families.

References 

Populated places in Shaft County